The Union of Journalists of Cuba (est. 1963) is a trade association of journalists and academics in Cuba.

References

This article incorporates information from the Spanish Wikipedia.

External links
 

1963 establishments in Cuba
Organizations based in Havana
Journalism organizations
Cuban journalists